Winston 500 may refer to the following NASCAR Sprint Cup races:

 Winston 500 (Spring), held at Talladega Superspeedway from 1971 to 1993 and in 1997
 Winston 500 (Fall), held at Talladega Superspeedway from 1998 to 2000